Marco Berardi (born 25 March 1996) is an Italian football player.

Club career

Fiorentina

Loan to Pordenone 
On 12 August 2016, Berardi was signed by Serie C side Pordenone on a season-long loan deal. On 6 September he made his Serie C debut for Pordenone, as a starter and played the entire match in a 1–1 away draw against Pro Piacenza. On 5 December, Berardi scored his first professional goal in the twelfth minute of a 3–1 home defeat against Cittadella. Berardi ended his season-long loan to Pordenone with 16 appearances and 1 goal.

Loan to Tuttocuoio 
On 19 July 2017, Berardi was loaned to Serie C side Tuttocuoio on a season-long loan deal. On 31 July he made his debut for Tuttocuoio in a 3–2 away defeat, after extra-time, against Casertana in the first round of Coppa Italia, he played the entire match. On 28 August, Berardi made his debut in Serie C for Tuttocuoio and he scored his first professional goal in the 86th minute of a 2–2 away draw against Prato. On 19 February 2018 he scored his second goal in the 64th minute of a 3–1 home win over Carrarese. Berardi ended his loan to Tuttocuoio with 33 appearances, including 30 as a starter, and 2 goals, but the team was relegated in Serie D.

Loan to Südtirol 
On 31 August, Berardi was signed by Serie C side Südtirol on a season-long loan deal. On 10 September he made his debut for Südtirol as a substitute replacing Michael Cia in the 70th minute of a 2–2 home draw against Fermana. On 8 October he played his second match as an 89th-minute substitute in a 3–1 home win over Modena. On 15 October he played his third match again as a substitute replacing Hannes Fink in the 46th minute of a 5–0 home win over Santarcangelo. On 8 April, Berardi played his fourth match again as a substitute replacing Hannes Fink in the 58th minute of a 2–0 home win over Fano. Berardi ended his loan to Südtirol with only 4 appearances, all as a substitute.

Career statistics

Club

References

External links
 

1996 births
People from Massa Marittima
Living people
Italian footballers
Association football midfielders
Pordenone Calcio players
A.C. Tuttocuoio 1957 San Miniato players
F.C. Südtirol players
Serie C players
Sportspeople from the Province of Grosseto
Footballers from Tuscany